Legnitzka, also Lugknitzka, is a small river of Saxony, Germany. It flows into the Lusatian Neisse near Bad Muskau, opposite the Polish town Łęknica.

See also
List of rivers of Saxony

Rivers of Saxony
Rivers of Germany